was a Japanese politician of the Liberal Democratic Party, a member of the House of Representatives in the Diet (national legislature). A native of Kasai, Hyōgo and graduate of the University of Tokyo, he joined the Ministry of Agriculture, Forestry and Fisheries in 1955. He was elected to the House of Representatives for Hyōgo 3rd district for the first time in 1986. He later represented the Hyōgo 4th district, and served as a House member until his defeat in 2009.

Death
On December 16, 2010, Inoue died of pneumonia at the age of 78.

Controversy 
Following the Sasebo slashing in 2004, where a 11-year old girl murdered a 12-year old girl, Inoue referred to Girl A, the murderer, as genki (vigorous, lively), a word with positive connotations. He also remarked that "Men have committed thoughtless, harsh acts but I think this is the first for a girl. Recently the difference between men and women is shrinking." These comments drew criticism from women's groups.

References 

1932 births
2010 deaths
Politicians from Hyōgo Prefecture
University of Tokyo alumni
Members of the House of Representatives (Japan)
Liberal Democratic Party (Japan) politicians
21st-century Japanese politicians
Deaths from pneumonia in Japan